"Overprotected" is a song by American singer Britney Spears from her third studio album, Britney (2001). It was written and produced by Max Martin and Rami. The song was released on December 10, 2001, by Jive Records as the second international single from Britney. "Overprotected" is a dance-pop song about a girl who is tired of being overprotected and just wants to be herself. The song received generally positive reviews from music critics. Its remixed R&B form, produced by Darkchild, was released as the third US single from Britney on April 2, 2002.

While it peaked only at number 86 on the US Billboard Hot 100, "Overprotected" peaked at number 22 in Canada and reached the top five in Italy, Romania, Sweden and the United Kingdom. An accompanying music video, directed by Billie Woodruff, portrays Spears dancing inside an abandoned factory; the music video for The Darkchild Remix, directed by Chris Applebaum, portrays Spears dancing and having fun with her friends. Spears has performed "Overprotected" a number of times, including during the Dream Within a Dream Tour (2001–2002) and The Onyx Hotel Tour (2004). In 2003, the song received a nomination for a Grammy Award for Best Female Pop Vocal Performance.

Background
During the Oops!... I Did It Again Tour (2000), Spears revealed she felt inspired by hip hop artists such as Jay-Z and The Neptunes and wanted to create a record with a funkier sound. In February 2001, Spears signed a $7–8 million promotional deal with Pepsi, and released another book co-written with her mother, entitled A Mother's Gift. On the same month, Spears started to record material for her third studio album, with "Overprotected" being recorded at Maratone Studios in Stockholm, Sweden. Additional recording was done in April 2001 at Maratone in Sweden, in which the song's vocals were completed. Background vocals were provided by Spears and Bosslady, with the track being mixed by Martin and Rami at Maratone Studios. Her third studio album, Britney, was released in November 2001. In an interview with the Daily Record, Spears concluded she can relate to "Overprotected" "on a personal basis, because I feel kind of overprotected. When I want to go out, everything has to be organized in advance. I think that other kids of my age can relate to it to a certain extent."

Composition

"Overprotected" is a dance-pop song that lasts for three minutes and 18 seconds. David Browne of Entertainment Weekly noticed Europop influences on the song, while other critics compared it to previous songs released by Spears. According to the sheet music published at Musicnotes.com by Universal Music Publishing Group, "Overprotected" is composed in the key of C minor and is set in time signature of common time, with a moderate tempo of 96 beats per minute. Spears vocal range spans from A3 to C5.

Lyrically, the track is about a girl who is tired of being manipulated by people around her and does not need to be told what to do, which is perceived in lines such as "You're gonna have to see through my perspective/ I need to make mistakes just to learn who I am/ And I don't want to be so damn protected". Dana Alice Heller, author of Makeover television: realities remodelled (2007), said that, with "Overprotected", "Spears addresses the problem of being a teen star whose personal and professional are handled by others." She also compared "Overprotected" with the singer's first reality show, Britney and Kevin: Chaotic (2005), saying that "Britney frames her makeover as a move toward to independence, a rebellion against overly controlling parents and their stand-ins."

Remixes
The song's main release in North America was a reworked R&B remix by Rodney "Darkchild" Jerkins. Jerkins said that the label "needed a remix that's crazy" and that the remix has "an old-school-type rhythm, which I think is kinda cool because it's an element [that Spears] never had, but I still gave it her edge. I was up all night rocking that joint. [It has the] same lyrics, I just reproduced the track." "The Darkchild Remix" was originally scheduled for release to radio stations in the United States in mid-March 2002; this date was pushed back and the song was released on April 1, 2002. The remix was heavily played in dance clubs, and Jerkins said he was not surprised with its popularity, stating "[Spears] reinvented herself. Everybody thought she was gonna come back with another 'Oops!... I Did It Again', but she went left and came with the 'I'm a Slave 4 U' joint, which is basically a club banger. You gotta big up people who reinvent themselves. I always said she was gonna be one of the people that's gonna be around for a minute, because I see that in her."

Finnish musician and record producer Jaakko Salovaara also created two remixes for the track, titled "JS16 Dub" and "JS16 Remix". The latter was included on the promotional soundtrack of Spears' film, Crossroads (2002).

Critical reception

Upon release, the track received generally positive reviews from music critics. Jocelyn Vena of MTV said that "with songs like 'Overprotected' and 'Let Me Be', Spears seemed to be letting out her adolescent angst", while Kyle Anderson of MTV Newsroom said, "the real first blush with emancipation from [the singer] teen pop past came with ['Overprotected']". While reviewing Spears' third studio album Britney (2001), Stephen Thomas Erlewine of AllMusic said the track, along with "I'm Not a Girl, Not Yet a Woman" and "What It's Like to Be Me", "are pivotal moments on Britney Spears' third album, the record where she strives to deepen her persona (not the same thing as her character, of course), making it more adult while still recognizably Britney".  Christopher Rosa, from Glamour, deemed it Spears' eight best song, and said that "feeling overly controlled or scrutinized is a consistent theme in Spears's discography, but this motif started with Overprotected", calling the song "introspection with a killer hook.

Critic Robert Christgau also considered "Overprotected" and "Cinderella" as the highlights of Britney, while saying, "hardly the first not-terribly-bright teenager to approach self-knowledge via the words of others". Nikki Tranker of PopMatters said the song "is an absolute belter reminiscent of Britney’s previous big-bang singles, 'Oops! I Did It Again' and 'You Drive Me Crazy' [sic]", while commenting that Spears "sings about ridding herself of the girlie chains around her, gripes about her need for space in the whirlwind that is her life, and lets us know she don’t need nobody telling her what to do". The staff from Entertainment Weekly placed it at number 24 on their ranking of Spears's songs and said that "there’s an eerie amount of foreshadowing for what was to come in her personal life. And Max Martin shows once again he had an unassailable gift for crafting that decade’s most indelible hooks". In 2003, the song received a Grammy nomination for Best Female Pop Vocal Performance. Digital Spy's Alim Kheraj hailed it "an anthem that deals with the complexities of growing up and being held back by other people's perceptions [...] full of distinctive chord progressions and more hooks than it seems possible to include in one song".

Chart performance
"Overprotected" attained commercial success in Europe. In France, it peaked at number 15, and was later certified Gold by the Syndicat National de l'Édition Phonographique (SNEP), for selling over 250,000 units of the single. In Sweden, the song reached number two, and was later certified Gold by the International Federation of the Phonographic Industry (IFPI), for selling over 15,000 units.

"Overprotected" reached number one in Mexico and was the best-selling single of 2002 in that country, also reached the top five in Italy, Romania, and United Kingdom, while reaching the top ten in Belgium (Flanders), Finland, Ireland, and Norway. In the United States, on the week of May 4, 2002, "The Darkchild Remix" peaked at number 86 on Billboard Hot 100, where it stayed on the chart for five weeks. It also entered on the Pop Songs chart, where it peaked at number 37 on the week of May 25, 2002, before dropping the chart in the following chart issue. In Canada, the song peaked at number 22 on the Canadian Hot 100.

Music videos

Original version
The music video for "Overprotected" was directed by Billie Woodruff and produced under Geneva Films, while choreographed by Brian Friedman. In an interview with Harper's Bazaar in 2011, Spears recalled the music video, saying, "I just think it says a lot. It was directed so well, it was really colorful and the dancing was amazing". It begins with Spears driving away from the paparazzi, with a part of the instrumental version of the song "Bombastic Love", featured on the album Britney, playing. She makes her way into an alleyway and decides to enter an abandoned factory, hoping her pursuers will be thrown off course. When she enters the building she begins to dance her way around the warehouse. Spears' dancers, having spotted her walking into the factory, follow her inside. They find Spears dancing around and joke about it, before heading into a heavy dance routine. Towards the end of the video, segments of Spears in a room with walls covered in pictures and articles about herself are also shown. These walls move in and out before the video ends, signifying that she is "overprotected". At the end of the video, Britney walks to a wall, and exits the building. The music video was the number-one video of MTV Mexico in the final countdown of 2002 "Los 100 más pedidos".

The Darkchild Remix

The music video for "The Darkchild Remix" was directed by Chris Applebaum and filmed in the first weekend of March 2002 in Los Angeles, California. It was produced under A Band Apart Productions, while the choreography for this version was also created by Brian Friedman. The full shooting took 23 hours, and Applebaum was said to be impressed with Spears' "stamina and patience through the marathon shoot, which wrapped 5 a.m." According to Joe D'Angelo of MTV News, "the clip furthers her 'I'm Not a Girl, Not Yet a Woman' crusade to shirk her adolescent image, as she and five friends outsmart her bodyguard with the old 'you're wanted elsewhere' trick and sneak out of a hotel and into an underground dance club." It was released on March 26, 2002.

Spears directly referenced Janet Jackson's "Son of a Gun (I Betcha Think This Song Is About You)" in the scenes on the elevator and when she and her dancers walk down the hotel lobby. Both videos also use the same hotel setting, filmed at Los Angeles' Millennium Biltmore Hotel.

The video opens with Spears and her friends in a hotel room, where a tabloid reporter on television criticizes her for the sexy, revealing outfits she is often seen wearing publicly. Spears and her friends express their disagreement with the report. Spears, determined to be self-sufficient and unaffected by media comments, then makes a phone call to her bodyguard, and using a cloth to disguise the sound of her voice, coaxes him to leave the area so that her group may sneak out of the hotel and enjoy the day. They run into an elevator and fool around briefly with the security cameras before going up to the main lobby. A strut down the lobby of the hotel and a short dance sequence follows. As they leave the hotel, they follow towards the dance club. However, before they arrive, they are caught in an alley by several paparazzi, and start to perform a dance routine in the middle of the rain. As they make their entrance, they are dripping wet, an image which makes for more sensationalist fodder for the tabloid reporter.

Live performances and usage in media

"Overprotected" was performed for the first time on 2001's Dream Within a Dream Tour. During the performance, Spears was dancing to the song surrounded by laser lights. The video backdrop showed images of a bald Spears, with her hair growing as the song went along. However, the backdrop was later removed for unknown reasons. After the announcement of the 2002 extension of the tour, some changes were made to the setlist, replacing the original mix of the song by "The Darkchild Remix". The remix was later performed on The Onyx Hotel Tour (2004), during the opening act, right after the performance of "Toxic". Spears' film, Crossroads (2002), features a performance of the song during the credits.

Track listings

Australian and New Zealand CD maxi single
 "Overprotected" (album version) – 3:21
 "Overprotected" (JS16 remix) – 6:10
 "Overprotected" (JS16 dub) – 5:28
 "Exclusive Chat with Britney" – 6:14
 "I'm a Slave 4 U" (album version) – 3:23
 "I'm a Slave 4 U" (Thunderpuss radio mix) – 3:18

European CD single
 "Overprotected" (album version) – 3:20
 "Overprotected" (JS16 remix) – 6:10

European, Thai, Israeli and South Korean CD maxi single
 "Overprotected" (album version) – 3:21
 "Overprotected" (JS16 remix) – 6:10
 "Overprotected" (JS16 dub) – 5:28
 "Exclusive Chat with Britney" – 6:14
 "Crossroads U.S. Movie Trailer" (video) – 2:16

US and UK promo CD single
 "Overprotected" (The Darkchild remix) – 3:20
 "Overprotected" (The Darkchild remix) [radio edit] – 3:06
 "Overprotected" (album version) [radio edit] – 3:18

US promo CD single
 "Overprotected" (album version) [radio edit] – 3:18
 "Overprotected" (The Darkchild remix) – 3:20
 "Overprotected" (The Darkchild remix) [radio edit] – 3:06

European promo CD single
 "Overprotected" (album version) – 3:20

European promo CD single
 "Overprotected" (Rip Rock 'N' Alex Remix) – 3:26

French and European CD single
 "Overprotected" (album version) – 3:20
 "Overprotected" (JS16 remix) – 6:10
 "Crossroads U.S. Movie Trailer" (video) – 2:16

Japanese CD maxi single
 "Overprotected" (album version) – 3:21
 "Overprotected" (JS16 remix) – 6:10
 "Overprotected" (JS16 dub) – 5:28

UK CD maxi single / UK cassette single
 "Overprotected" (album version) – 3:20
 "Overprotected" (JS16 remix) – 6:10
 "I'm a Slave 4 U" (Thunderpuss Mixshow edit) [the remix] – 6:17

 US 12" vinyl and US promo 12" vinyl
 "Overprotected" (The Darkchild remix) – 3:20
 "Overprotected" (The Darkchild remix) [radio edit] – 3:06
 "Overprotected" (The Darkchild remix) [instrumental] – 3:20
 "Overprotected" (album version) [radio edit] – 3:18
 "Overprotected" (album version) – 3:18
 "Overprotected" (album version) [instrumental] – 3:16

Brazilian promo CD single
 "Overprotected" (album version) – 3:21
 "Overprotected" (JS16 remix) – 6:10
 "Overprotected" (JS16 dub) – 5:28
 "Exclusive Chat with Britney" – 6:14

Digital download (digital 45)
 "Overprotected" – 3:20
 "Overprotected" (The Darkchild remix) – 3:19

Credits and personnel
Credits for "Overprotected" are adapted from Britney liner notes.

Technical
 Recorded and mixed at Maratone Studios in Stockholm, Sweden.
 Additional recording at Battery Studios in New York City, New York.

Personnel
 Britney Spears – lead and background vocals
 Max Martin – songwriting, production, mixing, guitar
 Rami Yacoub –  songwriting, production, mixing
 Boss Lady – background vocals
 Rodney Jerkins – remixing
 Michel Tucker – Pro Tools engineer
 Daniel Savio – turntables

Charts

Weekly charts

Year-end charts

Certifications

Release history

Notes

References

External links

Bibliography

 
 

2001 singles
2001 songs
2002 singles
Britney Spears songs
Jive Records singles
Music videos directed by Bille Woodruff
Music videos directed by Chris Applebaum
Song recordings produced by Max Martin
Song recordings produced by Rami Yacoub
Song recordings produced by Rodney Jerkins
Songs written by Max Martin
Songs written by Rami Yacoub
UK Independent Singles Chart number-one singles